The Baiyungu  are an Aboriginal Australian people of the Gascoyne region of Western Australia.

Country
He puts their eastern frontier at Winning Pool, while stating that their northern extension went as far as the area of Giralia and Bullara, falling short of the coastal areas up to and near the at North West Cape on the Exmouth Gulf.

Alternative names
 Baijungo
 Baiong, Baiung, Biong
 Kakarakala ("eastern fires"): This is a generic ethnonym subsuming several tribes from Shark Bay to the North West Cape under one rubric, and apparently arose from its use in this sense among the Mandi. Apart from the Baiyungu, three other tribes came under this heading: the Inggarda, the Maia and the Yinikutira.
 Paiunggu, Bayungu
 Payungu

Some words
  (totem center).

Notes

Citations

Sources

Aboriginal peoples of Western Australia